Henry Watson may refer to:

Henry Watson Jr. (1810–1891), American lawyer and planter
 Colonel Henry Watson (1737–1786), British military engineer
Henry William Watson (1827–1903), British mathematician
Henry Winfield Watson (1856–1933), Republican member of the U.S. House of  Representatives from Pennsylvania
H. B. Marriott Watson (1863–1921), Australian-born British novelist, journalist, playwright, and short-story writer
Henry Holgate Watson (1867–1939), druggist and political figure in British Columbia
Henry Keith Watson, member of the "L.A. Four", who participated in the beating of Reginald Denny during the 1992 Los Angeles riots
Henry Watson (born 1813), former slave who recounted his experiences in Narrative of Henry Watson, A Fugitive Slave
Henry Watson Powell (1733–1814), British officer during the Seven Years' War and American Revolutionary War

See also
Harry Watson (disambiguation)
Henry Watson Fowler (1858–1933), English schoolmaster and lexicographer